Davide Scala (born 2 January 1972) is a former professional tennis player from Italy.

Biography
Scala, a right-handed player from Bologna, turned professional in 1990. 

At the 1997 Italian Open, a top-tier tournament now known as the Rome Masters, Scala upset the world number 18 Tim Henman, en route to the third round. Playing as a qualifier, he was the only Italian to make it past the first round of the tournament. 

Other noted performances include a win over American veteran Patrick McEnroe at the Washington Classic and a quarter-finals appearance at the Bournemouth International, both in 1997.

He had a career-best ranking of 117 in the world.

References

External links
 
 

1972 births
Living people
Italian male tennis players
Sportspeople from Bologna